The Ariakon Overlord is a semi-automatic .68 caliber paintball pistol. 

The Overlord has what is claimed to be the fastest available loading system for a paintball pistol, the Rapid Release Magazine System. A lever at the back of the system releases the magazine, which is ejected with the help of a spring.

The pistol's power supply is a 12 gram CO2 powerlet. Brass Eagle 12-gram cartridges are known to work with these markers. Other cartridges may be difficult to eject, and some have been known to puncture the O-ring seal and create leaks.

Ariakon came out with an upgraded model, the Overlord RX, in early 2007 featuring cheaper, lighter magazines, a threaded barrel, and cutouts in the side of the CO2 chamber to reduce problems with the CO2 cartridges jamming.

See also
Paintball
Paintball marker
Scenario paintball

References

External links
Official Site

Paintball equipment